Peter Nworah (born 15 December 1990) is a Nigerian footballer who plays as a forward for Bangladesh Premier League club Abahani Limited Dhaka.

He was signed by Spartak Trnava in October 2013 and made his debut for them against Ružomberok on 2 November 2013. In August 2017, he moved to Hapoel Kfar Saba on a two year contract deal. He currently plays for Al-Faisaly SC.

References

External links
 
 SportMedia Group profile

1990 births
Living people
Nigerian footballers
Nigerian expatriate footballers
Nigeria youth international footballers
Association football forwards
CD Atlético Baleares footballers
1. FC Tatran Prešov players
Partizán Bardejov players
FC Spartak Trnava players
FK Železiarne Podbrezová players
MFK Zemplín Michalovce players
FC Hradec Králové players
Al-Jabalain FC players
Al-Ain FC (Saudi Arabia) players
Hajer FC players
Al-Markhiya SC players
Slovak Super Liga players
2. Liga (Slovakia) players
Saudi First Division League players
Saudi Professional League players
Qatari Second Division players
Expatriate footballers in Spain
Expatriate footballers in Slovakia
Expatriate footballers in Israel
Expatriate footballers in Saudi Arabia
Expatriate footballers in Qatar
Nigerian expatriate sportspeople in Spain
Nigerian expatriate sportspeople in Slovakia
Nigerian expatriate sportspeople in Israel
Nigerian expatriate sportspeople in Saudi Arabia
Nigerian expatriate sportspeople in Qatar